Vicious Rumors is the third album by the American heavy metal band Vicious Rumors, released in 1990.

A music video was made for "Don't Wait for Me".

Track listing

Personnel
Carl Albert – lead vocals, backing vocals
Geoff Thorpe – guitars, producer
Mark McGee – guitars, mandolin, backing vocals
Dave Starr – bass
Larry Howe – drums

Production
Mike Houghes – back cover logo concept
Geoff Thorpe – producer, mixing
Howie Weinberg – mastering
Anthony Ranieri – design
Jay Janini – photography
Michael Rosen – producer, engineer, mixing
Peggy Donnelly – A&R coordination
Mark McGee – producer (assistant), mixing
Bob Defrin – art direction
Stan Woch – front cover logo concept
Don Brautigam – front & back illustration

References

1990 albums
Vicious Rumors albums
Atlantic Records albums